Linda Elisabeth Hunter (born 10 December 1963) is a Zimbabwean former long-distance runner. She competed in the women's marathon at the 1988 Summer Olympics.

References

External links
 

1963 births
Living people
Athletes (track and field) at the 1988 Summer Olympics
Zimbabwean female long-distance runners
Zimbabwean female marathon runners
Olympic athletes of Zimbabwe
Athletes (track and field) at the 1990 Commonwealth Games
Commonwealth Games competitors for Zimbabwe
Place of birth missing (living people)